The 1892 United States presidential election in Wyoming took place on November 8, 1892, as part of the 1892 United States presidential election. State voters chose three representatives, or electors, to the Electoral College, who voted for president and vice president.

Wyoming participated in its first ever presidential election, having become the 44th state on July 10, 1890. The state was won by President Benjamin Harrison (R–Indiana), the 28th United States Ambassador to France Whitelaw Reid, with 50.52 percent of the popular vote, against representative James B. Weaver (P–Iowa), running with the Attorney General of Virginia, James G. Field, with 46.14 percent of the popular vote. Grover Cleveland was not on the ballot in Wyoming because his supporters fused with Weaver in an effort to deny Harrison Wyoming's electoral votes.

Results

Results by county

See also
 United States presidential elections in Wyoming

Notes

References

Wyoming
1892
1892 Wyoming elections